Rabbit Hill is a children's novel by Robert Lawson

Rabbit Hill may also refer to:

Rabbit Hill, Georgia, an unincorporated community 
Rabbit Hill, West Virginia, an unincorporated community in Brooke County
Rabbit Hill Historic District, in Medway, Massachusetts
Rabbit Hill Snow Resort, in Alberta, Canada
Rabbit Hill (Newbury Park), a knoll in Newbury Park, CA
Peter's Rock, a peak in North Haven, Connecticut